Holly is a 2006 drama film directed by Guy Moshe. The film is about an American stolen artifacts dealer in Cambodia who tries to save a young girl from child traffickers. It stars Ron Livingston, Chris Penn, and Thuy Nguyen.

Shot on location in Cambodia, it includes many scenes in actual brothels in the notorious red light district of Phnom Penh.

Plot 
Patrick, an American card shark and dealer of stolen artifacts, has been "comfortably numb" in Cambodia for years, when he encounters Holly, a 12-year-old Vietnamese girl, in the K11 red light village.  The girl has been sold by her impoverished family and smuggled across the border to work as a prostitute.

Patrick wants to save Holly, but Marie, a social worker tells him that paying for her freedom will supply the demand of the traffickers, which will cause more children to be trafficked. The social worker also tells him that the U.S. will not let him adopt Holly. Marie also informs him of the issues of reintegrating her into society.

Production

Writing 
In an interview in 2007, Moshe was inspired by a script by Guy Jacobson which Moshe felt had "tremendous potential". He took the script to his producing partner Nava Levin, who also worked on the film with him.

Filming 
The film was shot at a 200 ASA filming speed to make a unique grain structure and contrasted color. Moshe said that the film was very hard to produce, due to the fact that there were multiple languages being spoken, shooting six-day weeks, 17-hour days, in 100 degree Fahrenheit, and some of the cast members had received food poisoning.

Reception 
Jeannette Catsoulis of the New York Times called the film a "riveting story". She commented: "What could have been a gripping study of emotional resurrection devolves into a blurred odyssey of white guilt.". On Rotten Tomatoes, the film has a 65% approval rating, based on 23 reviews. Luke Y. Thompson of the San Luis Obispo New Times enjoyed the editing and cinematography of the film, specifically the slow-motion and the violins.

References

External links
 
 

2006 films
2006 drama films
American independent films
Films about prostitution in Cambodia
Films about human trafficking
Works about sex trafficking
Human trafficking in Cambodia
American drama films
2006 independent films
2000s English-language films
2000s American films